Daniel Christopher Newman (born June 14, 1981) is an American actor, model, and musician, with work appearing on the Twilight film soundtrack, and several television series' soundtracks, and with acting roles on The Walking Dead, The Vampire Diaries, and Homeland.

Early life and career 
Daniel Newman was born in Atlanta, and then when his parents divorced moved with his mother to a small farm town in Georgia. He was an extra on a few TV shows filmed in Georgia, as well as working in theatre productions in Atlanta. When he was older he then moved to Brooklyn to pursue music. He studied at Yale University for a short period, before moving to New York City to continue a music career. He struggled as a musician for a short time, before meeting photographer Bruce Weber. He began modelling, appearing on magazine covers and various other advertising. He modelled for Calvin Klein, Christian Dior, Louis Vuitton, and Tommy Hilfiger. He also appeared on the cover of the fashion photographer Thomas Knights's "Red Hot Exposed" 2017 calendar and redheaded art campaign.

While in New York, he enrolled in William Espers acting school to study acting.
He was cast for guest spots on American television shows such as 7th Heaven (1997), One Tree Hill (2006), Heroes (2009), and The Vampire Diaries (2012). He appeared briefly as one of Bane's thugs in the 2012 film The Dark Knight Rises. In 2016, he joined the cast of The Walking Dead as a recurring character named Daniel.

Personal life 
On the 15th January 2009, he was walking across an intersection in Hollywood and was hit by a drunk driver, who did not stop. He was sent to Intensive Care Unit at Cedars Sinai Hospital Los Angeles. The doctors gave Daniel 20% chance to live but he survived and made a full recovery.

In March 2017, Newman came out as bisexual, and has made appearances in support of GLAAD and the Human Rights Campaign.

In March 2020, Newman was tested in Atlanta for COVID-19. He had a mild case, and he was discharged from the hospital. His test was not processed because his case was mild.

In December 2020, Newman created an OnlyFans account where he would post "PG to maybe R-rated" content, but no pornography, he produces short films with other actors, directors and writers.

Filmography

Films

Television

References

External links 
 
 

1981 births
21st-century American male actors
American male film actors
American male television actors
Bisexual male actors
LGBT models
LGBT people from Georgia (U.S. state)
Living people
Male actors from Atlanta
Male models from Georgia (U.S. state)
Yale University alumni
21st-century LGBT people
American bisexual actors